The Billboard Hot 100 is a chart that ranks the best-performing songs in the United States. The chart was first issued in the magazine issue of August 4, 1958. Prior to that, Billboard published three popular song charts; the Top 100, the first Billboard chart to feature a combined tabulation of sales, airplay and jukebox play, Best Sellers in Stores, ranking the best-selling singles in retail stores and the Most Played by Jockeys, ranking the most played songs on US radio stations. With the foundation of the Hot 100, Top 100 and Most Played by Jockeys were discontinued and Best Sellers in Stores continued until October 13, 1958.

In 1958, twenty-five different songs were able to top one of the four charts. A majority of the songs which topped the Best Sellers in Stores, which Billboard considered the predecessor of the Hot 100, were able to also top the two other charts. The first song to top all three charts was Danny & the Juniors' "At the Hop".

On the Hot 100, eight acts hit the top, which were also their first. Those acts include Ricky Nelson, Domenico Modugno, The Elegants, Tommy Edwards, Conway Twitty, The Kingston Trio, The Teddy Bears, and The Chipmunks (even though David Seville went to number one earlier this year with “Witch Doctor“, which hit prior to the creation of the Hot 100).

Pre-Hot 100
NOTE: The Hot 100 Era officially began on Monday, August 4, 1958, which would be the week ending August 10 (issue date August 4).  The Best Sellers in Stores list issued through October 13.

Hot 100

Number-one artists

See also
1958 in music
List of Billboard number-one singles

References

Further reading
Fred Bronson's Billboard Book of Number 1 Hits, 5th Edition

External links
 American Radio History archive of nearly all Billboard magazines between 1920 and 2016

1958
1958 record charts